ISMS may refer to:

 -isms, a suffix commonly used in philosophy and politics
 Information security management system, an information security policy
 Integrated Safety Management System, a form of Safety Management System
 Inner Sydney Montessori School, Australia
 International Society of Military Sciences, an international military research organization
 Intelligent Short Message Service

See also 
 ISM (disambiguation)